Curlee may refer to:

Curlee (name)
S. D. Curlee, guitar manufacturer
Curlee House, also known as the Veranda House, historic house in Corinth, Mississippi, U.S.

See also

Curli
Curley (disambiguation)
Curly (disambiguation)